Madhoshi (English: Intoxication) is a 2004 Indian Hindi psychological thriller film. It was directed by Tanveer Khan and stars Bipasha Basu, John Abraham, Shweta Tiwari and Priyanshu Chatterjee.

Synopsis
Anupama Kaul is a woman whose sister lives in New York. One day she gets a call from her sister and while they are talking on the phone, her sister is killed by the September 11 attacks. Anupama is devastated. A few years later Anu is happily engaged to Arpit Oberoi then Arpit leaves for America for business reasons and Anu is wooed by a man named Aman. Anupama accidentally meets Aman who tells her he is a secret agent appointed for special mission to kill terrorists, gradually Anupama gets attracted to Amans hard working and caring character. When Arpit comes back from America, Anu tells him that she is in love with Aman and she can't marry Arpit. Then Arpit starts asking questions: Who is Aman?  Where does he live? She can answer these questions but there's no evidence to support her answers, which leads Arpit to ask "Does he even exist?" The truth is Aman doesn't exist. He is just a figment of Anupama's imagination. Her friends and family try to explain to her that Aman doesn't exist. Anupama refuses to listen. Anupama is shown to psychatrist who tells Anupama mind is affected by her sisters death she heard in phone and is in szhizophrenia, Anupama close friend tells to parents that she saw a boy similar to Aman. Then, suddenly, Aman comes and everyone can see him. On Anupama's and Aman's wedding day Aman confesses that he is really Arpit and that he got plastic surgery. The only way that his face looks exactly like Aman's is that Arpit got the drawings from Anupama's sketchbook. Anupama hears this confession for which Arpit now tells there is no other way than this for him to get her married for their two families friendly relation. Anupama's best friend asks her to show proof. Anupama shows pictures of her and Aman at the movies when Arpit is still in America without even taking a second glance at the pictures. Her friend shows the pictures to her and she sees that Aman wasn't there. Marriage happens. 6 months later , pschatry doctors conference hall, doctor declares amupama as the 1st pt cured from szizophrenia and Anupama tells to audience all because of Arpit who now sitting with his original face. Later, it is revealed that she was the victim of schizophrenia and Aman was just a part of her imagination. Ending scene Arpit and Anupama walk out of the hall to car and now anupama see Aman infront of car but turns to Arpit and then turns to Aman and now nobody is seen infront or around that area, and Anupama enters the car and arpit also enters the car and car keeps moving and aman is seen again approach to car window side where anupama sits but anupama turns and sits attached to Arpith .

Cast 
 Bipasha Basu as Anupama "Anu" Kaul
 John Abraham as Aman Joshi
 Priyanshu Chatterjee as Arpit Oberoi 
 Shweta Tiwari as Tabbasum
 Sudhanshu Pandey as Student in Train Scene (John Abraham's Old Entry Scene)
 Dolly Bindra
 Murali Sharma
 Vikram Gokhale as Dr. Pradhan
 Palak Tiwari as Anupama's friend
 Greg Roman as Kirus
 Adi Irani as Anupama’s brother in law 
 Anang Desai as Vishal Oberoi, Arpit's father
 Rajeev Verma as Rajeev Kaul, Anupama's father
 Smita Jaykar as Sumitra Rajeev Kaul, Anupama's mother
 Nandita Puri as Mrs. Oberoi, Arpit's mother
 Dinesh Kaushik as Nakul

Soundtrack
The soundtrack is composed by Roop Kumar Rathod. It consists of 4 songs crooned by singers such as Udit Narayan, Alka Yagnik, Sadhana Sargam, Sonu Nigam and Roop Kumar Rathod.

Critical response
Taran Adarsh of Bollywood Hungama gave the film 1.5 stars out of 5, writing "On the whole, MADHOSHI could've found all-round appreciation had the makers chosen a better climax. At the box-office, the film won't find many takers, partly due to its inappropriate ending and partly due to its clash with a number of films in the same week." Anupama Chopra writing for India Today gave a negative review stating "Each plot twist contends for Bollywood's worst ever - Chatterjee does a face/off with incredible ease and then reverts to his original face once Basu is cured; a thoughtful psychiatrist listens to two minutes of the patient's history and solemnly declares: she is suffering from schizophrenia. Basu, statuesque in bustiers and ethnic skirts, quivers in her best imitation of Hindi movie madness. It's death by cinema." 

Rujuta Paradkar of Rediff.com wrote "Madhoshi takes recourse in the tried and the tested Bollywood formula of imitating several Hollywood scripts in a desperate attempt to create something 'different.' " and gave the film three stars stating "Yet, I would, very generously, give Madhoshi three stars -- after all, anything is possible in Bollywood!."

See also
List of cultural references to the September 11 attacks

References

External links
 

2004 films
2000s Hindi-language films
Films set in 2001
Indian psychological thriller films
2004 psychological thriller films
September 11 attacks in popular culture
Films based on the September 11 attacks